In Greco-Roman Classical Mythology, the Astra Planeta (Ancient Greek:  (Astra Planêta); lit. "Wandering Stars", "Planets" (their Roman name is the Stellae Errantae)) are brothers, and are five of Eos' and Astraeus' children--along with the Anemoi and Astraea--personifying the Classical planets (minus the Sun and the Moon (Eos' siblings), and the Earth (Gaia)); Uranus, Neptune and Pluto are not included, as they are invisible to the naked eye and were thus unknown to the ancient Hellenic peoples.  
The Astra Planetas names are:  
 Phainon (Ancient Greek:  (Phainôn); lit. "Shining" (phainô)); the personification of the planet Saturn.  Associated with the god, Kronus/Saturn (Kronion).  
 Phaethon (Ancient Greek:  (Phaethôn); lit. "Blazing", "Shining" (phaethô)); the personification of the planet Jupiter.  Associated with the god, Zeus/Jupiter/Jove (Dios).  Phaethon also shares a similar name with Phaethon, the son of Helios and a queen of Aethiopia; after his disastrous attempt at driving the solar chariot, Phaethon was struck down by Zeus and placed into the sky as (also) the god of Zeus' planet - Jupiter.  
 Pyroeis (Ancient Greek:  (Pyroeis); lit. "Fiery" (pyroeis, pyra)); the personification of the planet Mars (see also History of Mars observation).  He was also called Mesonyx (from middle-night), the Midnight Star.  Associated with the gods, Mars/Ares &/or Herakles/Heracles.  
 Eosphorus/Phosphorus and Hesperus (Ancient Greek:  (Eôsphoros); lit. "Dawn-Bringer") / (Ancient Greek:  (Hesperos / Hesperus); lit. "Evening"); the personification of the planet Venus (see also Observations and explorations of Venus).  Associated with the goddess, Aphrodite/Venus.  The name, Eosphoros/Phosphorus, is specific to Venus in the morning, as the "Morning Star", and the name, Hesperus, is specific to Venus in the evening, as the "Evening Star"; while it was once believed that Venus in the morning and Venus in evening were two different celestial bodies, these two star-gods were later combined.  
 Stilbon (Ancient Greek:  (Stilbôn); lit. "Gleaming", "Glittering" (stilbô)); the personification of the planet Mercury.  Associated with the god, Hermes/Mercury.  

The term Astra Planeta can be translated as “star wanderer”, but of course are more commonly known as the “wandering stars” or the classical planets; and in antiquity, the planets Mercury, Venus, Mars, Jupiter and Saturn were all believed to be heavenly bodies that moved across the sky differently compared to the fixed stars and constellations.  Thus the five Astra Planeta were Phainon (representing the planet Saturn), Phaethon (representing the planet Jupiter), Pyroeis (representing the planet Mars), Eosphoros/Hesperus (representing the planet Venus), and Stilbon (representing the planet Mercury).  The planets or wandering stars-themselves would all subsequently be named after Roman deities (confusingly)--as were the later identified Neptune and Pluto (Uranus being the only planet named after a Greek deity)--although this was explained by the fact that the planets were sacred to that deity rather than the god/Astra Planeta being present there; therefore, in Greek mythology, the planet Saturn was sacred to the Titan, Cronus, the planet Jupiter was sacred to the Olympian, Zeus, the planet Mars sacred to the Olympian, Ares (due to Mars' reddish tint), the planet Venus sacred to Olympian, Aphrodite, and the planet Mercury sacred to Olympian, Hermes (being the one that moved the fastest).

The Astra Planeta were naturally considered to reside in the sky, but also as their journey would see them disappear below the horizon.  They were also considered to have homes within the River Oceanus/Okeanos, the earth-encircling river into which other constellations, the sun and moon also disappeared.  The Astra Planeta are the entourage of their mother, Eos (with Eosphoros/Hesperus (as the morning star) preceding her), and their uncle, Helios; in Greco-Roman artwork (Greek vase paintings, etc.), as-such all five of the Astra Planeta brothers are depicted as youths diving back-down into the river Oceanus, the endless ocean, along with Helios riding his chariot, and at daybreak the next day, they would all arise with their uncle, with the rising of the sun each day.  

Astra Planeta is also the name/title that is given, by-extension, to all star deities, collectively, in Greco-Roman mythology; during Cronus' reign, fearing them for their overpowering numbers and as potential enemies, Cronus banished them from the earth to live up in the abodes of his brother, Coeus (the personification of the celestial axis around which the heavens revolve) in their true forms, arranging into formations, becoming the first constellations--Eos and Astraeus siring Phainon, Phaethon, Pyroeis, Eosphoros/Hesperus and Stilbon all-afterwards.

See Also
 Wufang Shangdi (the Classical planets in Chinese mythology).

External links
 Theoi Project: Astra Planeta

Greek gods
Stellar gods
Children of Eos
Titans (mythology)
Personifications in Greek mythology